Fly grazing is the grazing of animals, such as horses, on land without the permission of the landowner.

United Kingdom 
This activity is being controlled in England by the Control of Horses Act 2015. In Wales, the issue is controlled by the Control of Horses (Wales) Act 2014.

References

Horse management